This is a list of records of the FIFA Women's World Cup.

General statistics by tournament

Debut of national teams

Overall team records
In this ranking 3 points are awarded for a win, 1 for a draw and 0 for a loss. As per statistical convention in football, matches decided in extra time are counted as wins and losses, while matches decided by penalty shoot-outs are counted as draws. Teams are ranked by total points, then by goal difference, then by goals scored.

Medal table

Comprehensive team results by tournament
Legend
 – Champions
 – Runners-up
 – Third place
 – Fourth place
QF – Quarter-finals
R2 – Round 2
R1 – Round 1
 – Did not qualify
 – Qualified but withdrew 
 – Withdrew during qualification / Disqualified during qualification (after playing matches)
 – Did not enter / Banned / Permanently banned
 – Hosts
Q – Qualified for forthcoming tournament

For each tournament, the number of teams in each finals tournament are shown (in parentheses).

Hosts

Host nations are granted an automatic spot in the World Cup group stage.

Results of defending finalists

Results by confederation
 — Hosts are from this confederation

AFC

CAF

CONCACAF

CONMEBOL

OFC

UEFA

Droughts
This section is a list of droughts associated with the participation of women's national football teams in the FIFA Women's World Cups.

Longest active World Cup appearance droughts
Does not include teams that have not yet made their first appearance or teams that no longer exist.

Longest World Cup appearance droughts overall
Only includes droughts begun after a team's first appearance and until the team ceased to exist; updated to include qualification for the 2023 FIFA Women's World Cup.

Teams: tournament position
Teams having equal quantities in the tables below are ordered by the tournament the quantity was attained in (the teams that attained the quantity first are listed first). If the quantity was attained by more than one team in the same tournament, these teams are ordered alphabetically.

 Most titles won 4:  (1991, 1999, 2015, 2019).
 Most finishes in the top two 5:  (1991, 1999, 2011, 2015, 2019).
 Most finishes in the top three 8:   (every tournament).
 Most finishes in the top four 8:  (every tournament).
 Most finishes in the top eight 8: ,  (every tournament).
 For a detailed list, see National team appearances in the FIFA Women's World Cup.
 Most second-place finishes 1:  (1991),  (1995),  (1999),  (2003),  (2007),  (2011),  (2015),  (2019).
 Most third-place finishes 3:  (1995, 2003, 2007),  (1991, 2011, 2019).
 Most fourth-place finishes 2:  (1991, 2015),  (1999, 2007).
 Most 3rd-4th-place finishes 3:  (1995, 2003, 2007),  (1991, 2011, 2019).
 Most 5th-8th-place finishes 4:  (1991, 2003, 2007, 2015).
 Most 9th-16th-place finishes 6:  (1991, 1995, 2003, 2007, 2011, 2019).

Consecutive
 Most consecutive championships 2:   (2003–2007),  (2015–2019).
 Most consecutive finishes in the top two 3:  (2011–2019).
 Most consecutive finishes in the top three 8:  (1991–2019).
 Most consecutive finishes in the top four 8:  (1991–2019).
 Most consecutive finishes in the top eight 8: ,  (1991–2019).
 Most consecutive championships by a confederation 2: UEFA (2003–2007), CONCACAF (2015–2019).

Gaps
 Longest gap between successive titles 16 years:  (1999–2015).
 Longest gap between successive appearances in the top two 12 years:  (1999–2011).
 Longest gap between successive appearances in the top three 12 years:  (1991–2003).
 Longest gap between successive appearances in the top four 12 years:  (1991–2003).
 Longest gap between successive appearances in the top eight 28 years:  (1991–2019).
 Longest gap between successive appearances in the finals 20 years:  (1999–2019).

Host team
 Best finish by host team Champion:  (1999).
 Worst finish by host team Quarterfinals:  (1991),  (1995),  (2007),  (2011),  (2015),  (2019).

Defending champion
 Best finish by defending champion Champion:  (2007),  (2019).
 Worst finish by defending champion Quarterfinals:  (2011).

Debuting teams
 Best finish by a debuting team Champion:  United States (1991).
 Best finish by a debuting team, excluding inaugural tournament Quarterfinals:  (1995),  (1999)

Other
 Most finishes in the top two without ever being champion 1:  (1999),  (2003),  (2007),  (2019).
 Most finishes in the top three without ever being champion 4:  (1991, 2003, 2011, 2019).
 Most finishes in the top four without ever being champion 4:  (1991, 2003, 2011, 2019).
 Most finishes in the top eight without ever being champion 6:  (1991–2007, 2015),  (1991–2003, 2011, 2019).
 Most finishes in the top four without ever finishing in the top two 2:  (2015–2019).
 Most finishes in the top eight without ever finishing in the top two 5:  (1995, 2007–2019).
 Most appearances without ever finishing in the top two 8:  (every tournament).
 Most finishes in the top eight without ever finishing in the top four 3:  (2007–2015).
 Most appearances without ever finishing in the top four 8:  (every tournament).
 Most appearances without ever finishing in the top eight 5: , (1991, 2007–2019).
 Teams that defeated tournament champion , 2011 (2–0 vs Japan).
 Most played final 2:  vs  (2011–2015).

Players: tournament position
Qualification: at least one appearance in each Finals tournament.

Most finishes in the top two

Most finishes in the top three

Most finishes in the top four

Most finishes in the top eight

Coaches: tournament position
 Most championships 2: Jill Ellis (2015–2019).
 Most finishes in the top two 2: Even Pellerud (1991–1995), Norio Sasaki (2011–2015), Jill Ellis (2015–2019).
 Most finishes in the top three 2: Even Pellerud (1991–1995), Tony DiCicco (1995–1999), Norio Sasaki (2011–2015), Jill Ellis (2015–2019).

Teams: matches played and goals scored

All time
 Most matches played 50: .
 Most wins 40: .
 Most losses 19: .
 Fewest losses 1: .  
 Most draws 7: .
 Most matches played without a win 15: .
 Most matches played until first win 9: .
 Most matches played until first draw 17: .
 Most matches played until first loss 10: .
 Most goals scored 138: .
 Most hat-tricks scored 5: .
 Most goals conceded 63: .
 Most hat-tricks conceded 4: .
 Fewest goals conceded 4: .
 Highest goal difference +100: .
 Lowest goal difference –43: .
 Highest average of goals scored per match 2.76: .
 Highest average of goals conceded per match 5.67: .
 Most meetings between two teams 6 times:  vs  (4–1–1) (1991, 2003, 2007, 2011, 2015, 2019).
 Most tournaments unbeaten 4:  (1991, 1999, 2015, 2019).

In one tournament
 Most wins 7:  (2019).
 Fewest wins, champions 4:  (2011) (out of 6).
 Most losses, champions 1:  (2011).
 Most goals scored 26:  (2019).
 Most goals scored, group stage 18:  (2019).
 Most goals scored, champions 26:  (2019).
 Most goals scored, hosts 18,  (1999).
 Most goals scored, eliminated in the first round 7:  (2003),  (2007).
 Fewest goals scored, champions 12:  (2011).
 Fewest goals scored, hosts 4:  (2015).
 Most goals conceded, champions 6:  (2011).
 Most goals conceded, hosts 7:  (2007).
 Fewest goals conceded, champions 0:  (2007).
 Fewest goals conceded, hosts 3:  (1999),  (2015).
 Fewest goals conceded, eliminated in the first round 2:  (2011);
 Most consecutive minutes without conceding a goal 540 minutes:  (2007),  (2015).
 Highest goal difference +23:  (2019).
 Highest goal difference, champions +23:  (2019).
 Highest goal difference, hosts +15:  (1999).
 Lowest goal difference -19:  (2019).
 Lowest goal difference, champions +6:  (2011).
 Lowest goal difference, hosts -2:  (2007).
 Highest average of goals scored per match 4.16:  (1991),  (2003).
 Highest average of goals scored per match, champions 4.16:  (1991),  (2003).
 Lowest average of goals scored per match 0.00:  (1991),  (1991),  (2003),  (2007),  (2011),  (2011).
 Lowest average of goals scored per match, champions 2.00:  (2011),  (2015).
 Highest average of goals conceded per match 6.67:  (2019).
 Highest average of goals conceded per match, champions 1.00:  (2011).
 Lowest average of goals conceded per match 0.00:  (2007).
 Lowest average of goals conceded per match, champions 0.00:  (2007).

Streaks
,  and the  have a 100% success rate in qualifying.
 Most consecutive wins 12: , from 1–0 vs Nigeria (2015) to 2–0 vs Netherlands (2019).
 Most consecutive matches without a loss 17: , from 2–2 vs Brazil (2011) to 2–0 vs Netherlands (2019).
 Most consecutive losses 8: , from 0–3 vs Denmark (1991) to 1–2 vs England (2011).
 Most consecutive draws 3: , from 3–3 vs Nigeria (2015) to 1–1 vs Australia (2015).
 Most consecutive matches without a draw 17: , from 0–4 vs China (1991) to 0–5 vs China (1999).
 Most consecutive top-scoring team 2:  (2003–2007).
 Most consecutive matches scoring at least one goal 15:  (1991–1999).
 Most consecutive matches scoring at least five goals 2:  (1991).
 Most consecutive matches without conceding a goal (clean sheets) 6:  (2007).
 Most consecutive minutes without conceding a goal 671 minutes:  (2003-2011).
 Most consecutive matches conceding at least three goals 4:  (1991–2007),  (2003–2007).
 Most consecutive matches conceding at least four goals 3:  (1995),  (2007),  (2015-2019).
 Most consecutive matches conceding at least six goals 2:  (1999),  (2003–2007),  (2015).

Individual

 Most tournaments played 7: Formiga (1995–2019).
 Most tournaments in squad 7: Formiga (1995–2019).
 See here for a list of players who have appeared in four or more FIFA Women's World Cups.
 Most championships 2: 32 players.
 See here for a list of  FIFA Women's World Cup winning players.
 Most medals 5: Kristine Lilly (1991–2007), Christie Rampone (1999–2015).
 Most appearances in All-Star Team 2: 10 players.
 Most matches played, finals 30: Kristine Lilly (1991–2007).
 Most knockout games played, finals 15: Kristine Lilly (1991–2007).
 Most minutes played, finals 2,537 minutes: Kristine Lilly (1991–2007).
 Most matches won 24: Kristine Lilly (1991–2007).
 Most matches drawn 5: Sun Wen (1991–2003).
 Most matches lost 10: Florence Omagbemi (1991–2003).
 Most appearances in a World Cup final 3: Birgit Prinz (1995, 2003–2007), Tobin Heath (2011–2019), Ali Krieger (2011–2019), Carli Lloyd (2011–2019), Alex Morgan (2011–2019), Megan Rapinoe (2011–2019).
 Most appearances as captain 16: Sun Wen (1995–2003).
 Most tournaments as captain 4: Christine Sinclair (2007–2019).
 Most appearances as substitute 8: Tiffeny Milbrett (1995–2003), Zhang Ouying (1999–2007).
 Youngest player : Ifeanyi Chiejine, vs North Korea, 20 June 1999.
 Youngest player, final : Birgit Prinz, vs Norway, 18 June 1995.
 Youngest player, qualifying match : Alina Litvinenko, vs Jordan, 27 April 2009.
 Youngest captain : Nkiru Okosieme, vs Germany, 17 November 1991.
 Oldest player : Formiga, vs France, 23 June 2019.
 Oldest player, final : Christie Rampone, vs Japan, 5 July 2015.
 Oldest player, qualifying match : Tonina Dimech, vs Turkey, 11 April 2010.
 Oldest captain : Sandrine Soubeyrand, vs Sweden, 16 July 2011.
 Oldest player to debut in a World Cup finals tournament : Meg, vs Japan, 17 November 1991.
 Largest age difference on the same team :  (1995).
 Largest age difference on a champion team :  (2011).
 Longest period between World Cup finals appearances as a player 15 years and 295 days: Wendi Henderson (1991–2007).
 Longest span of World Cup finals appearances as a player 24 years: Formiga (1995–2019).

Goalscoring

Individual

 Most goals scored, overall finals 17: Marta (2003–2019).
 Most goals scored in a tournament 10: Michelle Akers (1991).
 Most goals scored in a match 5: Michelle Akers, vs Chinese Taipei, 1991; Alex Morgan, vs Thailand, 2019.
 Most goals scored in a lost match 2: Genoveva Añonma, vs Australia, 2011.
 Most goals scored in a final match 3: Carli Lloyd vs Japan, 2015.
 Most goals scored in all final matches 3: Carli Lloyd, 3 vs Japan in 2015.
 Most matches with at least one goal 12: Abby Wambach (2003–2015).
 Most consecutive matches with at least one goal 6: Carli Lloyd (2015–2019).
 Most matches with at least two goals 5: Marta (2003–2011).
 Most consecutive matches with at least two goals 2: Michelle Akers (1991), Heidi Mohr (1991), Sissi (1999), Sun Wen (1999), Marta (2007), Megan Rapinoe (2019).
 Fastest hat-trick 5 minutes: Fabienne Humm, scored at 47', 49' and 52' vs Ecuador, 2015.
 Fastest hat-trick from kickoff 16th minute: Carli Lloyd, scored at 3', 5' and 16' vs Japan, 2015.
 Most tournaments with at least one goal 5: Marta (2003–2019), Christine Sinclair (2003–2019).
 Most tournaments with at least two goals 4: Mia Hamm (1991–2003), Bettina Wiegmann (1991–2003), Marta (2003–2011, 2019).
 Most tournaments with at least three goals 3: Bettina Wiegmann (1991–1999), Marta (2003–2011), Abby Wambach (2003–2011).
 Most tournaments with at least four goals 2: Ann Kristin Aarønes (1995-1999), Birgit Prinz (2003-2007), Marta (2007–2011), Abby Wambach (2007–2011), Cristiane (2007, 2019).
 Most tournaments with at least five goals 2: Birgit Prinz (2003–2007).
 Longest period between a player's first and last goals : Solveig Gulbrandsen (23 June 1999 – 22 June 2015).
 Longest period between one goal and the next : Anne Dot Eggers Nielsen (6 June 1995 – 12 September 2007).
 Youngest goalscorer : Elena Danilova, vs Germany, 2 October 2003.
 Youngest hat-trick scorer : Inka Grings, vs Mexico, 24 June 1999.
 Youngest goalscorer, final : Marianne Pettersen, vs Germany, 18 June 1995.
 Oldest goalscorer : Formiga, vs South Korea, 9 June 2015.
 Oldest hat-trick scorer : Cristiane, vs Jamaica, 9 June 2019.
 Oldest goalscorer, final : Megan Rapinoe, vs Netherlands, 7 July 2019.
 Most penalties scored (excluding during shootouts) 8: Bettina Wiegmann (2 each in 1991, 1995, 1999, 2003).
 First substitute winning goalscorer, final came on 88th minute: Nia Künzer, vs Sweden, 2003. 
 Fastest goal from kickoff 30 seconds: Lena Videkull, vs Japan, 1991.
 Fastest goal by a substitute 3 minutes: Pia Wunderlich, vs Russia, 2003; Linda Sembrant, vs Nigeria, 2015.
 Fastest goal from kickoff in a final 3rd minute: Carli Lloyd, vs Japan, 2015.
 Latest goal from kickoff 122nd minute: Abby Wambach, vs Brazil, 2011.
 Latest goal from kickoff in a final 117th minute: Homare Sawa, vs United States, 2011.
 Latest goal from kickoff in a final, with no goals scored between 69th minute: Alex Morgan, vs Japan, 2011.

Team
 Biggest margin of victory 13:  (13) vs  (0), 2019.
 Biggest margin of victory, qualifying match 21:  (21) vs  (0), 1997 AFC Championship Group A;  (21) vs  (0), 1998 CONCACAF Championship Group A;  (21) vs  (0), 1998 OFC Championship Group A;  (21) vs  (0), 1998 OFC Championship Group B;  (21) vs  (0), 2022 CONCACAF Women's Championship Qualification.
 Most goals scored in a match, one team 13: , vs , 2019.
 Most goals scored in a match, both teams 13:  (13) vs  (0), 2019.
 Highest scoring draw 3–3:  vs , 2015;  vs , 2019.
 Most goals scored in extra time, both teams 2:  (1) vs  (1), 2011;  (1) vs  (1), 2011.
 Most goals scored in a semi-final, both teams 7:  (5) vs  (2), 1991.
 Most goals scored in a final, one team 5: , vs , 2015.
 Most goals scored in a final, both teams 7:  (5) vs  (2), 2015.
 Fewest goals scored in a final, both teams 0:  (0) vs  (0), 1999.
 Most individual goalscorers for one team, one match 7: , vs , 2019 (Alex Morgan, Rose Lavelle, Lindsay Horan, Sam Mewis, Megan Rapinoe, Mallory Pugh, Carli Lloyd).
 Most individual goalscorers for one team, one tournament 10:  (1999: Mia Hamm, Julie Foudy, Kristine Lilly, Tiffeny Milbrett, Michelle Akers, Cindy Parlow, Shannon MacMillan, Tisha Venturini, Brandi Chastain, Joy Fawcett),   (2003: Bettina Wiegmann, Stefanie Gottschlich, Birgit Prinz, Kerstin Garefrekes, Sandra Minnert, Maren Meinert, Conny Pohlers, Martina Müller, Pia Wunderlich, Nia Künzer).
 Fewest individual goalscorers for one team, one tournament, champions 6:  (2011: Nahomi Kawasumi, Karina Maruyama, Aya Miyama, Yūki Nagasato, Shinobu Ohno, Homare Sawa).

Tournament
 Most goals scored in a tournament 146 goals: 2015, 2019.
 Fewest goals scored in a tournament 86 goals: 2011.
 Most goals per match in a tournament 3.84 goals per match: 1999.
 Fewest goals per match in a tournament 2.69 goals per match: 2011.
 Most scorers in a tournament 90: 2015.
 Most players scoring at least two goals in a tournament 31: 2003, 2015.
 Most players scoring at least three goals in a tournament 14: 2019.
 Most players scoring at least four goals in a tournament 9: 1991.
 Most players scoring at least five goals in a tournament 5: 1991, 2007.
 Most players scoring at least six goals in a tournament 4: 1991 (Michelle Akers, Carin Jennings, Linda Medalen, Heidi Mohr).
 Most players scoring at least seven goals in a tournament 2: 1991 (Michelle Akers, Heidi Mohr), 1999 (Sissi, Sun Wen).

Own goals

 Most own goals in a tournament 8: 2019.
 Most own goals scored in a match, player 2: Angie Ponce, vs Switzerland, 2015.
 Most own goals scored in a match, one team 2: , vs Switzerland, 2015.
 Scoring for both teams in the same match Brandi Chastain, vs Germany, 1999 – own goal in the 5th minute, goal in the 49th minute; Eva González, vs England, 2007 – own goal in the 9th minute, goal in the 60th minute; Angie Ponce, vs Switzerland, 2015 – two own goals in the 24th minute and 71st minute, goal in the 64th minute.

Top-scoring teams by tournament
 1991: , 25 goals
 1995: , 23 goals
 1999: , 19 goals
 2003: , 25 goals
 2007: , 21 goals
 2011: , 13 goals
 2015: , 20 goals
 2019: , 26 goals

Teams listed in bold won the tournament.

Total and average goals

Most and fewest in bold.

Goalkeeping
 Most matches played, finals 22: Bente Nordby (1995–2007).
 Most clean sheets (matches without conceding) 10: Briana Scurry (1995–2007).
 Most consecutive minutes without conceding a goal (finals) 622 minutes (6 consecutive clean sheets): Nadine Angerer (2007-2011).
 Most consecutive minutes without conceding a goal (one tournament) 540 minutes: Nadine Angerer (2007), Hope Solo (2015).
 Most goals conceded, one tournament 17: Shirley Berruz (2015).
 Most goals conceded, one tournament, hosts 6: Han Wenxia (2007).
 Most goals conceded, one match 13: Sukanya Chor Charoenying, vs United States, 2019.
 Fewest goals conceded, one tournament 0: Nadine Angerer (2007).
 Fewest goals conceded, one tournament, champions 0: Nadine Angerer (2007).
 Fewest goals conceded, penalty shootouts, one match 1: Ayumi Kaihori, vs United States, 2011; Ingrid Hjelmseth, vs Australia, 2019.
 Youngest goalkeeper : Cecilia Santiago, vs England, 27 June 2011.
 Oldest goalkeeper : Meg, vs Germany, 9 June 1995.

Coaching
 Most tournaments 5: Even Pellerud (1991–1995, 2003-2007, 2015).
 Most consecutive tournaments with same team 3: Silvia Neid (2007–2015).
 Youngest coach : Vanessa Arauz, vs Cameroon, 8 June 2015.
 Youngest coach, champions : Anson Dorrance, 1991.
 Oldest coach : Paulo Gonçalves, vs Sweden, 1 October 2003.
 Oldest coach, champions : Norio Sasaki, 2011.
 Quickest substitution made 6th minute:  Chong Tsu-pin, Hong Li-chyn for Liu Hsiu-mei, vs Nigeria, 1991;  Marika Domanski-Lyfors, Therese Lundin for Hanna Ljungberg, vs Ghana, 1999.
 Most finals appearances as player and head coach 5: Silvia Neid,  (1991 & 1995 as player; 2007, 2011 & 2015 as coach).
 First person to have played and coached at the finals April Heinrichs, was the first person ever to have had both roles – as player for United States in 1991 and later as coach in 2003.
 Best performance by a foreign coach A foreign coach has never managed a World Cup-winning team. The best performance by a team with a foreign coach is second place, reached by the United States in 2011 with Pia Sundhage of Sweden. The USA's coach for their 2015 and 2019 victories, Jill Ellis, was born and spent her early childhood in England, but moved to the U.S. with her family at age 14, and had been a U.S. citizen for many years before becoming head coach in 2014.

Ages average
 Youngest team 18 years, 8 months: , 1991.
 Youngest team, champions 23 years, 8 months: , 1991.
 Oldest team 29 years, 5 months: , 2015.
 Oldest team, champions 29 years, 5 months: , 2015.
 Lowest average of age at tournament 23 years, 11 months: 1991.
 Highest average of age at tournament 25 years, 2 months: 2007.

Refereeing
 Most tournaments 4: Kari Seitz (1999–2011).
 Most matches refereed, overall 10: Nicole Petignat (1999–2007).
 Most matches refereed, one tournament 5: Anna-Marie Keighley (2015).

Discipline
 Fastest sending off 2nd minute: Alicia Ferguson, vs China, 1999.
 Latest sending off 121st minute: Azusa Iwashimizu, vs United States, 2011.
 Most cautions (all-time, player) 5: Charmaine Hooper (1995–2003).
 Most sendings off (all-time, player) 1: 24 players.
 Most sendings off (tournament) 5: 1999 (in 32 matches).
 Most sendings off (all-time, team) 3: .
 Most sendings off (final match) 1: Azusa Iwashimizu, vs United States, 2011.
 Most cautions (tournament) 124: 2019 (in 52 matches). 
 Most cautions (all-time, team) 55:  (in 34 matches).
 Most cautions (match, both teams) 8:  (4) vs  (4), 2011.
 Most cautions (final match, one team) 3: , vs Germany, 1995.

Host records
 Most times hosted 2:  United States (1999, 2003),  China (1991, 2007).
 Had its best performance hosting Champions:  (1999).

Attendance
 Highest attendance in a match 90,185:  vs , 10 July 1999, Rose Bowl, Pasadena, United States.
 Highest attendance in a final 90,185:  vs , 10 July 1999, Rose Bowl, Pasadena, United States.
 Lowest attendance in a match 250:  vs , 8 June 1995, Olympia, Helsingborg, Sweden.
 Highest average of attendance per match 37,319: 1999, hosted by the United States.
 Highest attendance in a tournament 1,353,506: 2015, hosted by Canada.
 Lowest average of attendance per match 4,316: 1995, hosted by Sweden.
 Lowest attendance in a tournament 112,213: 1995, hosted by Sweden.

Total and average attendance

Penalty shootouts

 Most shootouts, team, all-time 3: .
 Most shootouts, team, tournament 2: , 2011.
 Most shootouts, all teams, tournament 3: 2011.
 Fewest shootouts, all teams, tournament 0: 1991, 2003, 2007.
 Most wins, team, all-time 2: .
 Most wins, team, tournament 1: 7 teams.
 Most losses, team, all-time 1: 8 teams.
 Most shootouts with 100% record (all won) 1: , .
 Most shootouts, kicker, all-time 2: Sun Wen (1995 quarterfinal, 1999 final), Xie Huilin (1995 quarterfinal, 1999 final), Shannon Boxx (2011 quarter final, 2011 final), Carli Lloyd (2011 quarterfinal, 2011 final), Abby Wambach (2011 quarterfinal, 2011 final), Camille Abily (2011 quarterfinal, 2015 quarterfinal), Gaëtane Thiney (2011 quarterfinal, 2015 quarterfinal).
 Most saves, all-time 3: Ayumi Kaihori.
 Most saves, tournament 3: Ayumi Kaihori, vs United States, 2011.
 Most saves, shootout 3: Ayumi Kaihori, 3 vs United States in 2011.

Extra time

By team
Most played 5:  (1991, 2003, 2011, 2015, 2015).
Most tournaments playing extra time 4:  (1991, 2003, 2011, 2015).

By tournament
Most played 4: 2011
Fewest played 0: 2007

See also
 FIFA World Cup records and statistics
 FIFA Women's World Cup qualification

Footnotes

References

FIFA Women's World Cup records and statistics
FIFA Women's World Cup-related lists
International women's association football competition records and statistics